Psylliostachys suworowii, the poker statice or Russian statice, is a species of flowering plant in the family Plumbaginaceae, native to Central Asia and Afghanistan, and introduced to scattered locales worldwide.

References

Plumbaginaceae
Garden plants of Asia
Flora of Central Asia
Flora of Afghanistan
Plants described in 1952